Chad D. Raduege is a United States Air Force brigadier general who serves as the Director of Command, Control, Communications and Computers/Cyber and Chief Information Officer of the United States European Command. He previously was the Director of Cyberspace and Information Dominance of the Air Combat Command.

References

External links

Year of birth missing (living people)
Living people
Place of birth missing (living people)
United States Air Force generals
Date of birth missing (living people)